"Bara du och jag" ("Only you and I") is a song by Swedish pop duo Lili & Susie from their second studio album Dance Romance (1987). The pop and disco song was written by Ola Håkansson and Tim Norell, and produced by Trigonometri. It peaked at number 18 on the Swedish singles chart.

Reception
Ronny Larsson of QX ranked the duo's singles in 2020, placing "Bara du och jag" at number five.

Track listing
7-inch
"Bara du och jag" – 4:12
"Du har min kärlek" – 3:56

Credits and personnel
Credits are adapted from the "Bara du och jag" single.
Ola Håkansson – songwriting
Tim Norell – songwriting
Trigonometri – production, arranging, recording

Charts

Tove Styrke version

In 2020, Swedish singer Tove Styrke recorded a cover of "Bara du och jag" for the TV4 music reality television series Så mycket bättre. Styrke's version was produced by Victor Thell. It was released as a single on 30 November 2020 through Milkshake and Sony Music. The song peaked at number 30 on the Swedish singles chart and was certified gold by the Swedish Recording Industry Association (GLF). "Bara du och jag" is included on Styrke's second extended play (EP) Så mycket bättre 2020 – Tolkningarna (2020) which includes her three covers from Så mycket bättre.

Charts

Certifications

Release history

References

1987 songs
1987 singles
2020 songs
2020 singles
Disco songs
Tove Styrke songs
Songs written by Tim Norell
Sony Music singles